Hazard is an English surname. The name originates in early medieval England. The surname first appears on record in the latter part of the 12th Century (below), and further early examples include: Geoffrey Hasard, noted in the 1185 Knights Templars' Records of Lincolnshire, and Walter Hassard(Kent, 1197). In later decades it would be spelled as either "Hazard" or "Hazzard.".

Augustus George Hazard, American gunpowder manufacturer and namesake of Hazardville, Connecticut
Benjamin Hazard (1770–1841), Rhode Island politician & attorney
Carder Hazard (1734–1792), Justice of the Rhode Island Supreme Court
Caroline Hazard (1856–1945), president of Wellesley College
Conor Hazard,  Irish goalkeeper
Dave Hazard, British karate expert
Dorothy Hazard, English religious reformer  
Ebenezer Hazard, American publisher and US Postmaster General
Eden Hazard, Belgian footballer, brother of Thorgan and Kylian
Erskine Hazard, industrialist
Geoffrey C. Hazard Jr., American law professor
George Hazard, Deputy colonial governor, Rhode Island
Henry T. Hazard, mayor of Los Angeles
Jeffrey Hazard (1762–1840), Justice of the Rhode Island Supreme Court
Jonathan Hazard, American statesman
Joseph Hazard (1728–1790), Justice of the Rhode Island Supreme Court
Kylian Hazard, Belgian footballer, brother of Eden and Thorgan
Manny Hazard, American football player
Micky Hazard, English footballer
Nathaniel Hazard (1776–1820), U.S. Congressman
Oliver Hazard Perry (1785–1819), American naval officer
Paul Hazard, French historian of ideas
Richard Hazard (1921–2000), American television composer
Robert Hazard (1948–2008), American musician
Robert Hazard (Rhode Island politician) (1702–1751), deputy governor of colonial Rhode Island
Roberta L. Hazard, admiral in U.S. Navy
Rowland Hazard (disambiguation), one of several people by this name
Thierry Hazard (born 1962), French singer
Thomas Hazard (c. 1610 – c. 1677, founding settler of Newport, Rhode Island
Thorgan Hazard (born 1993), Belgian footballer, brother of Eden and Kylian

See also
Hazzard (disambiguation), contains list of people with surname Hazzard

References